The Vakhvakhishvili is a Georgian noble family, originally known, since the twelfth century, in the province of Samtskhe whence they later moved to the kingdom of Kakheti. In the mid-17th century, they acquired the hereditary office of the Grand Master of the Hunt of Kakheti, and were listed among the Kakhetian nobility in a special document attached to the Russo-Georgian Treaty of Georgievsk of 1783. After the Russian annexation of Georgia, the family was confirmed in the princely rank (knyaz Vakhvakhov, Вахваховы) by the decrees of 1825 and 1850.

References 

Noble families of Georgia (country)
Georgian-language surnames